LUN or '''''' may refers the same

 Logical Unit Number, in computer storage
 Lun, Croatia, a town
 Lusaka International Airport (IATA airport code)
 Lunda language (ISO 639-3 language code)
 Lun-class ekranoplan, ground effect vehicles

See also
 Las Últimas Noticias, Chilean daily, frequently shortened to LUN